The Caledonian Railway 721 Class (known as the "Dunalastair" class) was a class of 4-4-0 steam locomotives designed by  John F. McIntosh for the Caledonian Railway (CR) and introduced in 1896. All survived to be absorbed by the London, Midland and Scottish Railway (LMS) in 1923 and a few survived into British Railways (BR) ownership in 1948.

Development
The "Dunalastair" class marked a new era of development in late-Victorian British steam locomotive design. The average weight of passenger trains had greatly increased in the 1880s and 1890s due to the demand for more comfortable, better-appointed and safer carriages. Combined with continually rising passenger volumes and the competition between railway companies to offer faster services and locomotive engineers were faced with producing engines that could operate longer, heavier trains at faster speeds. The existing pattern of inside-cylinder 4-4-0 express engine was reaching the limits of its development and many railways were resorting to the inefficient practice of double heading to maintain schedules.

McIntosh provided the solution with the original "Dunalastair" of 1896. The boiler also contained more fire tubes of a greater diameter than its predecessors, greatly increasing its steam generating capacity and overall steam volume. While the top speed of the 721 Class and its developments was largely the same as other express 4-4-0s the more productive and capacious boiler meant the type offered a hugely improved ability to maintain high speeds with heavy loads on steep gradients, allowing the "Dunalastairs" to set high average speeds over the Caledonian's arduous main line over Beattock Summit. So confident was McIntosh that his new engine would do away with the need for double heading that the "Dunalastairs" were originally built without brake hoses on their front buffer beam, meaning that a second engine could not be coupled to them.

The principles of the 721 Class and its boiler were adopted by many other locomotive engineers and railways in the 1890s and early 20th century, leading to the so-called 'big engine' period of design. Other engine classes such as the GNR Class C1 and the GWR 4100 Class were inspired by the success of the "Dunalastairs".

The class was very successful and developed in four different versions:
 Dunalastair I (721 Class) built 1896
 Dunalastair II (766 Class) built 1897 (some rebuilt with superheaters 1914)
 Dunalastair III (900 Class) built 1899–1900 (some rebuilt with superheaters 1914–18)
 Dunalastair IV (140 Class) built 1904–10 (some rebuilt with superheaters 1915–17)

The rebuilding with superheaters was accompanied by a reduction in boiler pressure and an increase in cylinder diameter.

There are two further classes of McIntosh 4-4-0 locomotives which some authors have included in the Dunalastair series. These are:
 139 Class, built 1910–12 with Schmidt superheaters
 43 Class, built 1913–14 with Robinson superheaters

During the national coal strike of 1912, some Caledonian locomotives, including Dunalastairs or 139 class engines, and two engines from class 812 were fitted with Holden oil burners for a short time. They received a  fuel tank atop the tender and more refractory bricks in the firebox.

Tenders 
In the 1930s newer and more powerful LMS locomotives took over their most long-distance duties and the company cascaded the 900 Class to other work. This made eight-wheel tenders superfluous so the company substituted smaller, lighter and simpler six-wheel tenders from scrapped Caledonian locomotives. Most members of the class received McIntosh tenders that had been built for classes 179, 600, 908 and 918. The six-wheel tenders had the same 4.5 ton coal capacity but carried only  of water.

Accidents and incidents
On 22 May 1915 three of these locomotives, no. 121 of the 139 Class, no. 140 of the Dunalastair IV Class and no. 48 of the 43 Class, were involved in the Quintinshill rail disaster. One of them, no. 121 was damaged beyond repair by the impact and scrapped whilst the other two were repaired.
Four enginemen were killed and five people were injured.

Dimensions
Table 1

Numbering
Table 2

The 139 Class and 43 Class are included in the Dunalastair series by some authors. Some locomotives survived into British Railways (BR) ownership in 1948.

Notes
 BR renumbered the engines by adding 40000 to the LMS numbers. The BR number series are not continuous because some engines were withdrawn before 1948.
 CR number 121 was withdrawn in 1915 after the Quintinshill disaster so did not receive an LMS number.

Belgian derivatives

Belgian State Railways (SNCB-NMBS) derived six series of steam locomotives (424 units) from the Dunalastair design between 1899 and 1913: 
 – regular 4-4-0 Dunalastair III design: driving wheel 1.98 m, 52.5 tons (built 1899–1901, 95 units, including five supplied by Neilson Reid) 
 Type 18 – more powerful than Type 17: 53.3 tons (built 1902–05, 128 units)
 Type 19 – (initially Type 18S): superheated version of type 18: 57.8 tons (built 1905, 6 units)
 Type 20 – (initially Type 18bis): upgraded (superheated and more powerful) type 18: 60.0 tons (15 units)
 – (initially Type 15bis): 4-4-2T tank locomotive based on Dunalastair III design: driving wheel 1.8 m, 62.0 tons, deep firebox (built 1900–01, 49 units)
 – same as Type 14, but with mid-deep firebox: 64.0 tons (built 1900–08, 73 units)
 – (initially Type 15S) superheated version of Type 15 with mid-deep firebox : 69.4 tons (built 1905–13, 78 units)
Two of them are preserved in cosmetic state by SNCB: 4-4-2 tank locomotive 16.042 and express locomotive 18.051.

18.051 also features an eight-wheel tender similar to the Caledonian eight-wheel tender. This kind of tender was used on Type 17 and some of the first Type 18 while the rest (including 18.051) had wider and larger six-wheel Belgian tenders. That one was salvaged when 18.051 was restored and was originally built for an older Type 18.

Withdrawal
The first Dunalastair to be withdrawn from service, other than for accident damage, was 14343 in 1933. The reason for its withdrawal is unclear. The next withdrawal was not until 1937. By 1944 only five members of the 900 Class remained. The last 900 Class survivor received the British Railways number 54434 and was based at  until it was withdrawn in 1948. None have survived to preservation.

See also
 Locomotives of the Caledonian Railway

References

Sources and further reading

External links

4-4-0 locomotives
721
Railway locomotives introduced in 1896
Scrapped locomotives
Standard gauge steam locomotives of Great Britain
Passenger locomotives